Amaechi Ottiji (28 December 1969 – 25 December 2004) was a Nigerian footballer who played as a forward for clubs in Nigeria, Greece and Germany.

Club career
Born in Enugu, Ottiji began playing football for Calabar Rovers. He played for Enugu Rangers and BCC Lions, winning the 1989 Nigerian FA Cup with BCC.

In 1990, Ottiji joined Greek Superleague side Panachaiki F.C. for 5.5 seasons appearing in 110 league matches and scoring 50 goals for the club. He transferred to Ionikos F.C. in December 1994, and would play 2.5 seasons for the club in the Greek Superleague.

He moved to German Regionalliga side SV Darmstadt 98 in 1998, but could not prevent the club from being relegated despite scoring 12 league goals. He spent the remainder of his career in the lower levels of German football, playing in the Regionalliga for Sportfreunde Siegen and SV Elversberg.

International career
Ottiji made one appearance for the Nigeria national team, in a friendly against Iran in 1998.

Death
He died in Colombia in 2004, during a shooting between rival gangs.

References

External links

Mention of Amaechi Ottiji's death 

1969 births
2004 deaths
Association football forwards
Nigerian footballers
Nigeria international footballers
Rangers International F.C. players
BCC Lions F.C. players
Panachaiki F.C. players
Ionikos F.C. players
SV Darmstadt 98 players
FC Gütersloh 2000 players
Sportfreunde Siegen players
VfB Oldenburg players
SV Elversberg players
Nigerian expatriate footballers
Expatriate footballers in Greece
Nigerian expatriate sportspeople in Greece
Expatriate footballers in Germany
Nigerian expatriate sportspeople in Germany
Super League Greece players
Footballers from Enugu